Mexborough First is a local political party based in Mexborough, South Yorkshire in England which holds all three of the town's seats on Doncaster Metropolitan Borough Council.

History 
The party was founded in 2012.

At the 2014 Doncaster Metropolitan Borough Council election, the party won 1 seat.

At the 2015 Doncaster Metropolitan Borough Council election, the party won 3 seats.

At the 2017 Doncaster Metropolitan Borough Council election, the party held their 3 seats

Ideology 
Mexborough First is a local party which opposes High Speed 2.

References

External links 

 Official website
 Mexborough First on Twitter

Locally based political parties in England
Mexborough